Ranchera or canción ranchera is a genre of traditional music of Mexico. It dates to before the years of the Mexican Revolution. Rancheras today are played in virtually all regional Mexican music styles. Drawing on rural traditional folk music, the ranchera developed as a symbol of a new national consciousness in reaction to the aristocratic tastes of the period.

The classic "rancheras" songs usually talk about life in Mexico not only in rural areas, but also portray life in Mexico at the time of the bandits. classic duels, drunkenness in a canteen, a heartbreak, a place that is longed for, a horse. If the ranchera will be about someone and his feats become a corrido 

That said, it refers to romanticizing canteens,charros "Mexican cowboy", firearms, love affairs and duels.

Definitions

The word ranchera was derived from the word rancho because the songs originated on the ranches and in the countryside of rural Mexico.

Traditional themes in rancheras are about love, patriotism or nature.

Songs are usually in a major key, and consist of an instrumental introduction, verse and refrain, instrumental section repeating the verse, and another verse and refrain, with a tag ending. Rancheras are also noted for the grito mexicano, a yell that is done at musical interludes within a song, either by the musicians and/or the listening audience.

The normal musical pattern of rancheras is a–b–a–b. Rancheras usually begin with an instrumental introduction (a). The first lyrical portion then begins (b), with instrumental adornments interrupting the lines in between. The instruments then repeat the theme again, and then the lyrics may either be repeated or begin a new set of words. One also finds the form a–b–a–b–c–b used, in which the intro (a) is played, followed by the verse (b).  This form is repeated, and then a refrain (c) is added, ending with the verse.

The most popular ranchera composers include Lucha Reyes, Cuco Sánchez, Antonio Aguilar, Juan Gabriel and José Alfredo Jiménez, who composed many of the best-known rancheras, with compositions totaling more than 1,000 songs, making him one of the most prolific songwriters in the history of western music.

Another closely related style of music is the corrido, which is often played by the same ensembles that regularly play rancheras. The corrido, however, is apt to be an epic story about heroes and villains, or the narrator's lifestyle.

See also 
 Rocío Dúrcal
 La Prieta Linda
 Vicente Fernández

References

 Brenner, H. (1996). Música ranchera. Das mexikanische Äquivalent zur Country and Western Music aus historischer, musikalischer und kommerzieller Sicht (Música ranchera: El equivalente mexicano de la música country y la música del Oeste) (Musikethnologische Sammelbände 14). Foreword by Thomas Stanford. Tutzing: Verlag Hans Schneider, 1996 .

External links
Musical analysis
Northern ranchera lyrics

 
Regional styles of Mexican music
Mexican styles of music
Mariachi